Vivid is the fifth studio album by American contemporary R&B singer Vivian Green, released August 7, 2015. It is Green's first album released on Kwamé's record label Make Noise Records (which is distributed via Caroline Records); and was produced by Kwamé, As of November 2015, the album has not charted on the Billboard 200 but has reached #10 on the Billboard R&B chart.

The album's first single is "Get Right Back to My Baby", which has reached number eight on the U.S. Adult R&B chart.

Critical reception
The album has received positive reviews. Andy Kellman of AllMusic rated the album four out of five stars and called Green's vibe on the album "confident and comfortable". BrentMusicReviews.com called the album "a fine collection" and "a welcome R&B effort".

Track listing

Chart positions

Samples

References

External links
 
 

2015 albums
Albums produced by Kwamé
Caroline Records albums
Vivian Green albums